DeWolfe is a surname. Notable people with the surname include:

Gordon Dewolfe Barss (born 1916), Baptist missionary who served in India during 1939–1980 through the Canadian Baptist Ministries
Alfred B. DeWolfe (1895–1954), Canadian politician
Barbara DeWolfe (1912–2008), American ornithologist, pioneering in studies of avian life history and physiology, especially the white-crowned sparrow
Chris DeWolfe (born 1966), American entrepreneur and the former CEO and co-founder of Myspace (along with Tom Anderson)
Florence Mabel Kling DeWolfe (1860–1924), the First Lady of the United States from 1921 to 1923 as the wife of President Warren G. Harding
James DeWolfe (born 1949), former political figure in Nova Scotia, Canada
Marshall Eugene DeWolfe (1880–1915), the only child of future First Lady Florence Harding and her first husband, Henry Athenton "Pete" DeWolfe
DeWolfe Miller III (United States Navy), Vice Admiral in the United States Navy and current Commander, Naval Air Forces
James P. deWolfe (1896–1966), the fourth bishop of the Episcopal Diocese of Long Island

See also
DeWolf (disambiguation)
DeWolf family
De Wolf
De Wolfe
De Wolfe Music - British production music company, originator of library music.
Wolf (name)
Wolfe (surname)

Wulf,  common Germanic name element